The Ralliement créditiste du Québec fielded several candidates in the 1970 Quebec provincial election, twelve of whom were elected. Information about the party's candidates may be found on this page.

Candidates

Labelle: Eugène Caraghiaur
Eugène Caraghiaur ran as a Social Credit or Créditiste candidate in two federal elections and one provincial election. He sided with Réal Caouette after the federal party's 1963 split. Caraghiaur identified as an engineer consultant.

References

Candidates in Quebec provincial elections
1970